The Parade All-America Boys Basketball Team was an annual selection by Parade that nationally honored the top high school boys' basketball players in the United States. It was part of the Parade All-American series that originated with boys basketball before branching to other sports. Started by the Sunday magazine in 1957, it had been the longest ongoing selection of high school basketball All-Americans in the country at the time of its final selections in 2015. Many of the honorees went on to star as college and professional basketball players. As of March 2011, there were 162 Parade All-Americans that were playing in the National Basketball Association (NBA).

At its onset, the selections were handled by a New York-based public relations firm, Publicity Enterprises, which was led by Haskell Cohen, who was a former sportswriter as well as the publicity director for the NBA at the time (1950–1969). The first All-America team in 1957 consisted of three five-player teams, and the first-team selections appeared on television on The Steve Allen Show. The following year, 20 players were selected and participated in the first annual Parade All-American high school game. The list later expanded to 40 of the nation's top players, divided into four teams of 10 each. Kareem Abdul-Jabbar, known then as Lew Alcindor, became the first sophomore in 1963 to be named a Parade All-American.  Fifteen years later, Earl Jones became the next sophomore to earn first-team honors, and subsequently joined Abdul-Jabbar as the first two players to be named to the first team on three occasions. "It was a real thrill for me to make it on the Parade list early, when I was just a sophomore. The recognition is a great thing for kids to shoot for," said Abdul-Jabbar as part of the announcement for the 2000 team.

Starting in 2011, the selections were compiled in conjunction with Sporting News and their writer, Brian McLaughlin.  Candidates also began to be limited to players in their senior year. The selections went to a single-team format in 2012, and the size was reduced from 40- to a 20-player first team in 2014. McLaughlin described the selections as mostly Division I college-bound players that had a stellar senior year in high school.  Additionally, Parade differentiated itself from most other All-American teams by not focusing solely on a player's standing among college recruiters.  For example, some selectors might choose top recruits that had been injured much of their senior year. Parade discontinued its boys' basketball All-America selections after 2015.

Selections

1957–1959

1960–1969

1970–1979

1980–1989

1990–1999

2000–2009

2010–2015

Notes

References

External links
Parade All-America at Sports Reference, includes players' college statistics

 
Awards established in 1957
Awards disestablished in 2015
1957 establishments in the United States
2015 disestablishments in the United States